is the northernmost island in Geiyo Islands chain accommodating Nishiseto Expressway connecting Honshu and Shikoku islands. Its coasts are washed by Seto Inland Sea.

Geography
The Mukaishima is pear-shaped and separated from the Honshu mainland by 200-meters wide strait.

History
1983 - Innoshima bridge is complete
1991 - island has become a filming ground for Chizuko's Younger Sister film directed by Nobuhiko Obayashi in 1991.
2005 - towns of the island are incorporated into Onomichi city.
2013 - cycling and hiking course of Mukaishima is complete

Transportation
The Mukaishima is connected to the mainland of Honshu and Innoshima islands by bridges of Nishiseto Expressway (Shimanami Kaidō). The island is served by the national Route 317. The buses to Mukaishima can be taken from Hiroshima, Fukuyama or Onomichi cities.

Economy and industry
The Mukaishima Island is the important shipbuilding center, with several shipyards on the north of the island producing coastal vessels. Also, Mukaishima Dockyard is the leading ship repair center in Japan, serving about 300 ships annually.

Notable residents
 - manager
Kaiji Kawaguchi - manga author
Mariko Yoshida - wrestler

See also
Onomichi, Hiroshima
Mukaishima, Hiroshima

References
This article incorporates material from Japanese Wikipedia pages 向島町 and 向東町, accessed 4 September 2017

Islands of Hiroshima Prefecture
Islands of the Seto Inland Sea
Geiyo Islands